New Territories Heung Yee Kuk Tai Po District Secondary School is a government secondary school on  in Tai Po, Tai Po District, Hong Kong.

It has a  property with a classroom building with six storeys.

History
In 1984 it had 997 students. The average class size was 40.

It began a beautification and cleanliness programme circa 1993 to improve the learning environment.

Operations
As of 1993 it periodically has an "open day" where students from other Tai Po District schools see displays of the students enrolled at NTHYK Tai Po Secondary.

See also
 List of government schools in Hong Kong
 List of schools in Tai Po District
 List of secondary schools in Hong Kong

References

External links
 New Territories Heung Yee Kuk Tai Po District Secondary School 

Tai Po District
Secondary schools in Hong Kong